Herbert Pierce Nolan (21 November 1875 – 21 December 1933) was an Australian rules footballer who played with Fitzroy in the Victorian Football League (VFL).

References

External links

 

1875 births
1933 deaths
Fitzroy Football Club players
Australian rules footballers from Melbourne
People from Wyndham Vale, Victoria